The 1956–57 Iowa State Cyclones men's basketball team represented Iowa State University during the 1956-57 NCAA College men's basketball season. The Cyclones were coached by Bill Strannigan, who was in his third season with the Cyclones. They played their home games at the Iowa State Armory in Ames, Iowa.

They finished the season 16–7, 6–6 in Big Seven play to finish in third place. Gary Thompson won Big Seven Player of the Year, edging out Wilt Chamberlain of Kansas. Iowa State also picked up their first ever win over a top ranked team, defeating Kansas, 39–37.

Roster

Schedule and results 

|-
!colspan=6 style=""|Regular Season

|-

References 

Iowa State Cyclones men's basketball seasons
Iowa State
Iowa State Cyc
Iowa State Cyc